The Division III Women's College World Series (WCWS) is the final portion of the NCAA Division III Softball Championship for college softball teams in Division III.

Softball was one of twelve women's sports added to the NCAA championship program for the 1981–82 school year, as the NCAA engaged in battle with the AIAW for sole governance of women's collegiate sports. The AIAW continued to conduct its established championship program in the same twelve (and other) sports; however, after a year of dual women's championships, the NCAA conquered the AIAW and usurped its authority and membership.

The most successful team in championship history is TCNJ, which has six national titles.

Results

Champions

 Schools highlight in yellow have reclassified athletics from NCAA Division III.

See also 
 College softball
 NCAA Division I Softball Championship
 NCAA Division II Softball Championship
 AIAW Intercollegiate Women's Softball Champions
 NAIA Softball Championship

References

External links
NCAA Division III softball webpage

NCAA Softball Championship
Champion
Softball
Recurring sporting events established in 1982